Viña del Mar Airport  is an airport serving Viña del Mar and Valparaíso, Chile.

Accidents and incidents
On 9 September 2013, A Corpflite Dornier 228, registration CC-CNW crashed into power lines while attempting to land in fog, resulting in the loss of both crew members.

See also

List of airports in Chile
Transport in Chile

References

External links
Viña del Mar at OpenStreetMap
Viña del Mar at OurAirports

Airports in Chile
Airports in Valparaíso Region